Paikbheri (also written as Paik Bheri) is a  village in the Bhagabanpur I CD block in the Egra subdivision of the Purba Medinipur district in the state of West Bengal, India.

Geography

Location

Urbanisation
96.96% of the population of Egra subdivision live in the rural areas. Only 3.04% of the population live in the urban areas, and that is the lowest proportion of urban population amongst the four subdivisions in Purba Medinipur district.

Note: The map alongside presents some of the notable locations in the subdivision. All places marked in the map are linked in the larger full screen map.

Demographics
According to the 2011 Census of India, Paikbheri had a total population of 1,124, of which 577 (51%) were males and 547 (49%) were females. There were 985 persons in the age range of 0–6 years. The total number of literate persons in Paikbheri was 910 (92.39% of the population over 6 years).

Culture
David J. McCutchion mentions the Shyama Sundara temple as a plain flat-roofed structure with pancha-ratna superstructure measuring 28’9” x 25’7” and possibly built in 1730. There is a char-chala porch measuring 19’4” sq plus 17’9” sq attached to a deul.

Paikbheri picture gallery

References

External links

Villages in Purba Medinipur district